Venmony is a village in Chengannur taluk of Alappuzha district of Central Travancore area in Kerala state, India. Venmoney is 18 km south of Thiruvalla, 11 km east of Mavelikkara and 9 km northwest of Pandalam. 12 km from Chengannur. It is located 55 km towards East from District headquarters Alappuzha. 107 km from State capital Thiruvananthapuram and 138 km from Cochin International Airport. The village is on the border of the Alappuzha District and Pathanamthitta District. The Achenkovil river flows on its southern boundary and is spanned by the Pulakadavu bridge.

Demographics 

Venmony has a population of 19,932, of which 9,073 are males and 10,859 are females as per the 2011 census. A total of 5,569 families reside in the village.

The population of children ages 0-6 is 1,630 which makes up 8.18% of total population of village. The average sex ratio of Venmony is 1,197, which is higher than the Kerala state average of 1084. The child sex ratio for the Venmony as per census is 961, lower than the Kerala average of 964.

In 2011, the literacy rate of Venmony was 96.68% compared to 94.00% for Kerala. The male literacy rate was 97.67%, while female literacy rate was 95.87%.

Landmarks 
One of the most notable landmarks in Venmony is the Sharngakavu Devi Temple (Chamakkavu). Known for the monkeys thriving in its sacred grove, there is no explicit building structure for the temple, as its goddess has forbidden any construction at the site. The Vishu festival at the temple on Medam 1st usually falls on April 14 and is well known for its Kettu Kazhcha, in which huge decorated chariots and stuffed wooden horses known as Kuthiras are presented. There is also a flea market with food shacks on weekly Wednesdays for the sale and purchase of native crafts, pottery, utensils and farm products and in Vishu days with an extensive merchandise. Betel leaves produced in Venmony are sometimes referred to as "Venmoney Vettila".

Kalliyathara Junction is the city centre of Venmony.

St. Mary's Orthodox Church or Venmoney Valiya Pally, located near Kalliyathara Junction, is an important landmark known for Ettu Nombu Perunnal. It is 2 km northwest away from St Mary's Kochu Pally is situated.

Venmoney Sehion Mar Thoma Church, St Peter Malankara Catholic Church and St Joseph Latin Catholic Church located near to Kalliyathara Junction

There are two mosques in this village.  One is situated in Venmoney Thazham – (called Venmoney Muslim Jama-Ath) and one is in Punthala.

Akshaya Center- Common Service Center- situated in Kalliyathra Junction.

References 

Villages in Alappuzha district